Simplice Sarandji (born 4 April 1955 in Baoro, Ubangi-Shari, now Central African Republic) is the former Prime Minister of Central African Republic. He previously acted as the chief of staff for Prime Minister Faustin-Archange Touadera, and the campaign manager during Touadera's successful Presidential campaign. Prior to his political career, he lectured in geography at the University of Bangui.

Educational career
Simplice Sarandji holds a Doctor of Philosophy degree in Geography from Michel de Montaigne University Bordeaux 3, and subsequently taught the subject for four years at the University of Bangui, where he also became Dean.

Political career
Previously, Sarandji served as chief of staff for Faustin-Archange Touadera while the latter served as Prime Minister, for five years between 2008-13. The two were familiar with each other from when they were each students. Sarandji also acted as Touadera's campaign director during the December 2015–February 2016 presidential election. After Touadera took office as President, he appointed Sarandji as Prime Minister on 2 April 2016.

He named his first cabinet on 12 April, consisting of 23 members including Jean-Serge Bokassa, Charles Armel Doubane and Joseph Yakete, each of whom had run against Touadera for President. Sarandji elected not to include any members from the Christian and Muslim militias behind the violence in the 2013 coup. As Prime Minister, his security is provided by a Rwanda National Police Protection Support Unit which is deployed to the Central African Republic as part of the United Nations stabilization mission. He subsequently praised the Rwandan peacekeepers for introducing a form of community work in Rwanda called Umuganda into the Central Africa Republic.

References

1955 births
Living people
Prime Ministers of the Central African Republic
Presidents of the National Assembly (Central African Republic)
People from Nana-Mambéré
Bordeaux Montaigne University alumni
Academic staff of the University of Bangui